Ajit Varki is a physician-scientist who is distinguished professor of medicine and cellular and molecular medicine, co-director of the Glycobiology Research and Training Center at the University of California, San Diego (UCSD), and co-director of the UCSD/Salk Center for Academic Research and Training in Anthropogeny (CARTA). He is also executive editor of the textbook Essentials of Glycobiology and distinguished visiting professor at the Indian Institute of Technology in Madras and the National Center for Biological Sciences in Bangalore. He is a specialist advisor to the Human Gene Nomenclature Committee.

Education and biography
Varki went to the Bishop Cotton Boys' School, Bangalore, India during which time he was also strongly influenced by his maternal grandfather Pothan Joseph, a famous journalist and founding editor of many Indian newspapers, including Deccan Herald.  He went on to receive basic training in physiology, medicine, biology, and biochemistry at the Christian Medical College, Vellore, continuing to maintain the first rank in his class throughout his schooling. He then did postgraduate training at the University of Nebraska and Washington University School of Medicine, leading to board certification in internal medicine, hematology, and oncology. Following a postdoctoral fellowship with Stuart Kornfeld in St. Louis, he joined the faculty of UCSD in 1982. Significant past appointments include: associate dean for physician-scientist training, co-head, Division of Hematology/Oncology, UCSD (1987–89), the interim directorship of the UCSD Cancer Center (1996–97), scientific advisor to the Complex Carbohydrate Research Center (University of Georgia), the Yerkes Primate Center (Emory University), member of the National Advisory Committee of PubMed Central (NLM/NIH), and coordinator for the multidisciplinary UCSD Project for Explaining the Origin of Humans.

Research interests
The research group led by Varki has made many contributions over the last few decades towards understanding the biological roles of the sugar chains or "glycans" found on all vertebrate cell surfaces and glycoproteins. In this field of Glycobiology, his present focus is on the Sialic Acids, which are found at the outermost position on such glycans, and which can be recognized by intrinsic receptors such as Selectins and the Siglecs (which he co-discovered and named as a sub-group of I-type Lectins), and also by the binding proteins of various pathogens. The group studies the significance of these interactions in biology, evolution and disease. A particular focus is on multiple differences in sialic acid biology between humans and our closest evolutionary cousins, the great apes. These represent unusual events that occurred during human evolution and are relevant to understanding aspects of human uniqueness in health and disease.

General interests
Varki has emphasized the key role of Physician-Scientists in the success of the US biomedical enterprise, and advocated for the support and preservation of this track at the national level. He also played a key role in advocating for a chimpanzee genome project, while emphasizing the need for ethical treatment of chimpanzees in research. He continues to advocate for and facilitate interactions amongst scientists with interests in explaining the origin of the human species.  In this regard, he coined the term "Phenome", in the context of recommending a "Great Ape Phenome Project". While Editor-in-Chief of the Journal of Clinical Investigation, Varki made it the first major biomedical journal to be freely available on the web in 1996, presaging the general "Open Access" movement that came years later. He also created the first viable model for a major Open Access textbook, the 2nd. Edition of the textbook Essentials of Glycobiology.  Varki is also very concerned about improving the support systems for women who pursue academic scientific careers, while also wishing to bear children. Varki and his wife Nissi enjoy entertaining, including a Christmas Carols celebration serving Tandoori goose.

Open Access
While Editor-in-Chief of the Journal of Clinical Investigation, Varki made it the first major biomedical journal to be freely available on the web in 1996. Varki wrote, "The vexing issue of the day is how to appropriately charge users for this electronic access. The nonprofit nature of the JCI allows consideration of a truly novel solution — not to charge anyone at all!". As executive editor of Essentials of Glycobiology, Varki also made it the first major biomedical textbook that was fully open access.

Diet and disease 
Varki's group has recently shown that a diet rich in red meat can result in accumulation of a non-human sialic acid molecule called Neu5Gc ("Gc") in the intestines and other tissues. This can allow type of dangerous E.coli toxin to affect the human body. Also, humans develop antibodies against this foreign Gc molecule, increasing the risk of diseases like cancer.

Mind Over Reality Transition (MORT) 
Varki developed an idea proposed in 2005 by the late Danny Brower of the University of Arizona into a theory called Mind Over Reality Transition (MORT) which has been published in two letters and two books. MORT proposes an evolutionary mechanism to explain the emergence of behaviorally modern humans and some of their unique behaviors including an extended theory of mind and a tendency to deny reality.

Honors
Varki is an elected member of the American Academy of Arts and Sciences, the Institute of Medicine, the American Society for Clinical Investigation, and the Association of American Physicians. He is recipient of a MERIT award from the NIH, an American Cancer Society Faculty Research Award, and the two highest honors in the field of glycobiology, the Karl Meyer Award of the Society for Glycobiology (2005) and the International Glycoconjugate Organization (IGO) Award (2007). He was also elected to serve as president of the Society for Glycobiology (1996), Editor-in-Chief of the Journal of Clinical Investigation (1992–97), and president of the American Society for Clinical Investigation (1998–99).

Selected publications
Beyond his primary research accomplishments, Varki has written many widely cited and influential review articles, commentaries and letters on a variety of topics. Some examples are listed below. His publications have been cited more than 60,000 times and he has an h-index of 122.

See also
Glycomics
Genome

External links

Glycobiology Research and Training Center
Center for Academic Research and Training in Anthropogeny

References

Living people
Scientists from Kerala
Indian emigrants to the United States
University of Nebraska alumni
University of California, San Diego faculty
Bishop Cotton Boys' School alumni
Year of birth missing (living people)
Journal of Clinical Investigation editors
Members of the National Academy of Medicine
Washington University School of Medicine alumni